Coopers is a neighborhood of Bramwell, Mercer County, West Virginia, United States. It was named after John Cooper, a figure in the local mining industry.

References

Geography of Mercer County, West Virginia
Neighborhoods in West Virginia
Coal towns in West Virginia